Colin Will (born 1942) is a Scottish poet and publisher. His themes reflect a love of people and the natural world, often in language derived from his scientific background. 

Will was formerly librarian at the Royal Botanic Garden Edinburgh from 1988-1998, after which he occupied several positions in senior management. He chaired the Board of the Scottish Poetry Library and was President of the Scottish Library Association in 2000. He also chaired the Board of StAnza: Scotland's International Poetry Festival, from 2006 to 2009, and was re-elected Chair for a further term in 2014. He was awarded a Hawthornden Fellowship in 2013.

Published works
 Thirteen ways of looking at the Highlands and more, Diehard, 1996
 Landings : poems from Normandy, Calder Wood Press, 1998
 The flowers of Scotland, Calder Wood Press, 1998
 Roundabout Livingston : local poems, Calder Wood Press, 1998
 Painted fruits : poems, Calder Wood Press, 1998
 Seven senses, Diehard, 2000
 Sushi & chips, Diehard, 2006
 The floorshow at the Mad Yak Café, Red Squirrel Press, 2010
 The propriety of weeding, Red Squirrel Press, 2012
 The year's six season : poems, Calder Wood Press, 2013

References

Scottish poets
Scottish publishers (people)
Scottish librarians
1942 births
Living people
Place of birth missing (living people)